The 1983–84 snooker season was a series of snooker tournaments played between 4 July 1983 and 19 May 1984. The following table outlines the results for the ranking and the invitational events.


Calendar

Official rankings 

The top 16 of the world rankings, these players automatically played in the final rounds of the world ranking events and were invited for the Masters.

New professionals
The World Professional Billiards and Snooker Association (WPBSA) received 39 applications for professional status for the start of the season. Its subcommittee for considering these (made up of Ray Reardon, John Virgo and Willie Thorne) recommended 17 for acceptance, and these were ratified by the WPBSA Board. The new professionals were Jim Bear, Bob Chaperon, Gino Rigitano, Joe Caggianello and Gerry Watson from Canada; Francois Ellis and Mike Hines from South Africa; George Ganim and James Giannaros from Australia; Paul Mifsud from Malta; Paddy Browne from Ireland; and Tony Jones, Steve Duggan, John Parrott, Neal Foulds, Bill Oliver and John Hargreaves from England.

Notes

References

1983
Season 1984
Season 1983